Tamara Zitcere (2 December 1947 - 25 July 2014) was a Latvian scientist, Holocaust researcher and teacher of Northern States Gymnasium (Ziemeļvalstu ģimnāzija). She is known for her research - the Riga Ghetto's List (Jewish ghetto in Riga, 1941–1943.).

Riga Ghetto's List
Tamara Zitcere one of the notable research accomplishments is Riga Ghetto's List (1941–1943.). The Riga Ghetto's List contain references of the Jewish people registered at Riga ghetto. It includes address, age, place of birth, occupations and previous and sometimes further place of residence. Zitcere's research was a unique Holocaust study in its scope and content. The research shows that the houses of former Riga Ghetto were separated from the rest of the city with barbed wire; these houses became a shelter for 29,602 Jews forced to leave their initial residences during 1941–1943. Zitcere reviewed 346 books of House registers at the Latvian State Historical Archive, including more than 68 from the Riga ghetto.

The total number of houses in Riga Ghetto was 81. Zitcere's research found more than 5,764 Jewish victims of the ghetto. This approach was used to study the records of house registers of 1941 to identify Jewish residents of Matisa and Merkela streets and Stabu street, Riga, Latvia. The Riga Ghetto's List was exhibited at the Riga Ghetto and Latvian Holocaust Museum in Riga, Latvia and Yad Vashem, Jerusalem, Israel.

References

External links  
 The Riga Ghetto's List (1941—1943.) by T.Zitcere, Latvian Holocaust Museum
 The Riga Ghetto's List (1941—1943.) by T.Zitcere, Yad Vashem, Jerusalem, Israel

1947 births
2014 deaths
The Holocaust